The 1995 Zagreb Open was a women's tennis tournament played on outdoor clay courts at the Športski Park Mladost in Zagreb in Croatia that was part of Tier III of the 1995 WTA Tour. It was the second edition of the tournament and was held from 24 April through 30 April 1995. Fifth-seeded Sabine Appelmans won the singles title.

Finals

Singles

 Sabine Appelmans defeated  Silke Meier 6–4, 6–3
 It was Appelmans' only singles title of the year and the 6th of her career.

Doubles

 Mercedes Paz /  Rene Simpson defeated  Laura Golarsa /  Irina Spîrlea 7–5, 6–2
 It was Paz's only title of the year and the 25th of her career. It was Simpson's 2nd title of the year and the 3rd of her career.

External links
 WTA tournament edition details
 ITF tournament edition details

Zagreb Open

Zagreb Open
Croatian Bol Ladies Open